K07AAF-D, VHF digital channel 7 (virtual channel 25), is a low-powered television station licensed to Corsicana, Texas, United States and serving the Dallas–Fort Worth Metroplex. The station is owned and operated by Ventana Television, the holding company for Home Shopping Network's low-power television stations. Before going silent, the station served as the market's HSN affiliate.

History
The station, previously owned by Caballero Television (in turn, owned by Eduardo Caballero), signed on as a Mas Musica affiliate for almost 3 years, showing Spanish music videos. In August 2001, the station was acquired by Ventana Television and dropped Mas Musica in favor of HSN.

The then-K25FW-D was one of the last remaining low-powered analog stations in the Dallas/Fort Worth area, having switched to digital on January 24, 2011.

KPXD-TV (as well as all other Ion Television owned-and-operated stations) acquired HSN on DT6 sometime in late 2013 through early 2014. At that time, K25FW-D began broadcasting "HSN2". Two years later, after Ion Media Networks lost the rights to HSN, the network returned to K25FW-D.

On April 12, 2019, K25FW-D shut down its channel 25 digital transmitter as a part of the broadcast frequency repacking process following the 2016-2017 FCC incentive auction. The station remained silent while it constructed its post-repack facility on assigned displacement channel 7. The station was licensed for operation on channel 7 effective January 19, 2022, simultaneously changing its call sign to K07AAF-D.

References

External links

07AAF-D
Television channels and stations established in 2000
2000 establishments in Texas
Low-power television stations in the United States